Lesley A. Isherwood (born December 2nd, 1972) is a Judge of the Kansas Court of Appeals.

Education and legal career 

Isherwood earned her Bachelor of Arts in English, with honors, from Washburn University in 1995, she graduated from the Washburn University School of Law in 1998. After graduating law school, she briefly practiced with Williams, Stroble, Malone, Mason & Ralph, P.A., in Dodge City, Kansas. From 1999 to 2021 she was a prosecutor for Sedgwick County and concurrently served as the senior assistant district attorney in the appellate division.

Kansas  Court of Appeals 

Isherwood was one of three candidates recommended to the governor, along with Carl A. Folsom, III and Russell J. Keller. On February 18, 2021, Governor Laura Kelly nominated Isherwood to be a judge of the Kansas Court of Appeals to the seat vacated by the retirement of Judge Steve Leben. On March 23, 2021, she was confirmed by the Kansas Senate by a 40–0 vote. She was sworn in on April 30, 2021.

References

Living people
Place of birth missing (living people)
21st-century American judges
21st-century American women lawyers
21st-century American lawyers
American prosecutors
District attorneys in Kansas
Kansas Court of Appeals Judges
Kansas lawyers
Washburn University alumni
Washburn University School of Law alumni
1972 births